is a Japanese animation studio formed by former Bones producer Yonai Norimoto.

Productions

Television series

Films

Original video animations

References

External links
Official website 
 

 
Animation studios in Tokyo
Nishitōkyō, Tokyo
Japanese animation studios
Japanese companies established in 2013
Mass media companies established in 2013